The Ghosts of Edendale is a 2003 low budget supernatural thriller film written and directed by Stefan Avalos. It is distributed by Warner Brothers. The film was shot in Silver Lake, Los Angeles, California and was shot entirely on video.

Plot
Kevin and Rachel move to Los Angeles to follow their dream – making it in cinema. They can't believe their luck when they find the perfect house on a hill called Edendale – right next door to Hollywood. Here, all the neighbors are in "the business", and they have high hopes for Kevin and Rachel.

But Rachel's dreams soon turn to nightmares. First, there's something hiding in the closet, then, the awful crying in the walls, and now, Kevin is acting strange. Terrified, Rachel thinks she must be going crazy – but could her insanity extend to the hill itself?

As the neighbors eagerly await the completion of Kevin's work, Rachel must convince him to leave this place before the powerful Ghosts of Edendale reach through time to possess his very soul.

Cast
Paula Ficara as Rachel
Stephen Wastell as Kevin
Andrew Kirsanov asd Nolan
Keith Fulton as Julian
Louis Pepe as Alex
Patrick Hasson as Fred
Ethan Grant as Andrew
Nathan Lum as ghost boy
Jay Brown as homeless man
Robert Lane as Edward Habert
Maureen Davis as Rose
Cynthia King as beautiful blonde
Arthur Guzman as cowboy ghost
Conor McCarthy as ghost photographer
Terry A. O'Connell as making fire ghost
Christine Charters as ghost with jewelry box
Michael Kowalski as ghostman
Scott Hale as ghost man
Casey Schatz as ghost man
Marianne Connor as party guest
Amy D'Alio as party guest
Richard Clark as party guest
Anthony Happel as party guest
Stephen J. Croke as party guest
Caitlin McCarthy as party guest
Esther Jantzen as party guest
Christopher Morden as party guest
Joseph Wicen as party guest
Shannon Paapanen as party guest

Production
The Ghosts of Edendale as a film is an interesting retracing of film history in the actual locations it was shot.
The story of Tom Mix, his life and death is an integral part of the story, and also an interesting history lesson in Hollywood Lore.

Reception
On review aggregator website Rotten Tomatoes the film has a score of 80% based on reviews from 5 critics, with an average 6.8/10 rating.

See also
List of ghost films

References

External links

American ghost films
American supernatural thriller films
2000s thriller films
2000s English-language films
2000s American films